The men's 3000 metres event at the 1969 European Indoor Games was held on 9 March in Belgrade.

Results

References

3000 metres at the European Athletics Indoor Championships
3000